The Supermarine Spiteful was a British Rolls-Royce Griffon-engined fighter aircraft designed by Supermarine to Air Ministry  specification F.1/43 during the Second World War as a successor to the Spitfire. It had a new wing design to improve its critical Mach number, and allow safe operations at higher speeds. The new design also had a modern inwards-retracting undercarriage. Other changes included a larger fin to improve the somewhat marginal stability of Griffon Spitfires and changes to the mounting of the engine to tilt it down slightly for better visibility over the nose.

The Spiteful was ready for production as the war was ending, but was passed over in favour of jet-powered designs. The Royal Navy continued development as the Supermarine Seafang as it was not clear jets could safely operate from aircraft carriers, but the success of the de Havilland Sea Vampire led to this project being cancelled in 1945. Discussions with the French firm SNCAC to produce the Spiteful under licence were abandoned when France produced jet engines. Of the original order for 150 Spitefuls, only a small number were completed.

Design and development
In 1942 in order to improve the Spitfire's rolling characteristics, the Air Ministry asked Supermarine to devise a new wing, and to introduce a "laminar flow section" into the wing. 
By 1942, Supermarine designers had realised that the characteristics of the Spitfire's wing at high Mach numbers might become a limiting factor in increasing the aircraft's high-speed performance. The main problem was the aeroelasticity of the Spitfire's wing; at high speeds the relatively light structure behind the strong leading edge torsion box would flex, changing the airflow and limiting the maximum safe diving speed to 480 mph (772 km/h) IAS. If the Spitfire were to be able to fly higher and faster, a radically new wing would be needed.

Joseph Smith and the design team were aware of a paper on compressibility, published by A.D. Young of the R.A.E, in which he described a new type of wing section; the maximum thickness and camber would be much nearer to the mid-chord than conventional airfoils and the nose section of this airfoil would be close to an ellipse. In November 1942, Supermarine issued Specification No 470 which (in part) stated

Specification 470 described how the wing had been designed with a straight taper to simplify production and to achieve a smooth and accurate contour. The wing skins were to be relatively thick, aiding torsional rigidity which was needed for good aileron control at high speeds. Although the prototype was to have a dihedral of 3° it was intended that this would be increased in subsequent aircraft. To improve the ground-handling, the Spitfire's narrow-track, outward-retracting undercarriage was replaced with a wider-track, inward-retracting system. (This eliminated a weakness in the original Spitfire design, giving the new plane safer landing characteristics, comparable to the Hawker Hurricane, Hawker Typhoon, Hawker Tempest, Mustang and Focke-Wulf Fw 190.) The Air Ministry was impressed by the proposal and in February 1943, issued Specification F.1/43 for a single-seat fighter with a laminar flow wing; there was also to be provision made for a wing folding scheme to meet possible Fleet Air Arm requirements. The new fighter was to use a fuselage based on a Spitfire VIII. Three aircraft with contra-rotating propeller were ordered under the specification - intended to be largely experimental to test the wing and propeller. Supermarine were left to decide whether to use a Merlin or Griffon; the  first two aircraft were built with Griffons, the third with a Merlin but all had the contra-rotating propeller. The Specification also called for the wing to be used on Mark  VIII or Mark 21 airframes with the expectation that it would be used on production lines from the end of 1944.

The new wing was fitted to a modified Spitfire XIV serial NN660, in order to make a direct comparison with the earlier elliptical wing, and was first flown on 30 June 1944 by Jeffrey Quill. Although the new Spitfire's speed performance was comfortably in excess of an unmodified Spitfire XIV, the new wing displayed some undesirable behaviour at the stall which, although acceptable, did not come up to the high standards of Mitchell's earlier elliptical wing. NN660 crashed on 13 September 1944 while performing mock-combat at low altitude with a standard Spitfire, killing pilot Frank Furlong. No reason for the loss was officially established, although Quill suspected that the aileron control rods had momentarily seized, the Spiteful using control rods rather than the Spitfire's cables. Quill noted that from then on a careful check was always made of the control rods at the factory, and that type of accident never re-occurred.

In the meantime, the opportunity had been taken to redesign the Spitfire's fuselage, to improve the pilot's view over the nose and to eliminate gross directional instability by using a larger fin and rudder. This instability had been apparent since the introduction of the more powerful Griffon engine. The instability was exacerbated by the increase in propeller blade area due to the introduction of the four-bladed and subsequent five-bladed Rotol airscrews for the next aircraft, NN664 (the first to be built to the full F.1/43 specification ). The updated design incorporated the new fuselage (although lacking the enlarged fin/rudder) and, as it was now substantially different from a Spitfire, the aircraft was named "Spiteful" (although "Victor I" had been originally proposed to be applied to the Mark 21 with standard wing with Victor II for Mark 21s with laminar wing. The name Valiant was also under consideration.). NN664 first flew in January 1945.

The Spiteful was found to have higher speed than the Spitfire, but the increase was not as great as had been expected. The Spiteful had more adverse compressibility effects and poorer stalling characteristics than its predecessor. Nonetheless, the wing was judged suitable for jet aircraft and was fitted to the Supermarine Type 392.

Operational history

The Spiteful was ordered into production as the Spiteful XIV (having no preceding marks of its own, the numerals were carried over from the original Spitfire XIV conversion), and 150 of the aircraft were ordered. With the advent of jet propulsion, however, the future of high-performance fighters was clearly with the jet-engined aircraft, and so the order was later cancelled with only a handful of Spitefuls built. At the time however, there was some uncertainty over whether jet aircraft would be able to operate from the Royal Navy's aircraft carriers so it was decided to develop a naval version of the Spiteful, to specification N.5/45, subsequently named Seafang.

The Seafang featured folding wingtips, a "sting"-type arrester hook and a Griffon 89 or 90 engine, fed from an extended carburettor air intake driving two new Rotol three-bladed contra-rotating propellers. The first one produced was a converted Spiteful XV (RB520) but with the successful operation of the de Havilland Sea Vampire from the carrier  in 1945, the need for the Seafang disappeared.

With the end of the Second World War, Supermarine entered into discussions with Société Nationale de Constructions Aéronautiques du Nord (SNCAN) about licence production of the Spiteful in France, but again the introduction of jet fighters overshadowed the piston-engined fighter and the talks came to nothing.

Variants
 Spiteful F Mk 14 - 19 built (two prototypes and 17 production)
Engine: Griffon 69 - 2,375 hp (1,771 kW)
Weight: 9,950 lb (4,513 kg)
Max Speed: 483 mph (777 km/h)
 Spiteful F Mk 15 - one built - converted to Seafang prototype
Engine: Griffon 89 - 2,350 hp (1,752 kW)
Weight: 10,200 lb (4,627 kg)
Max Speed: 476 mph (766 km/h)
 Spiteful F Mk 16 - two built - simple, three-speed Griffon conversions from F Mk 14s
Engine: Griffon 101 - 2,420 hp (1,805 kW)
Weight: 9,950 lb (4,513 kg)
Max Speed: 494 mph (795 km/h) at 28,500 ft, 408 mph (656 km/h) at sea level
 Seafang F.Mk 31 - eight built
Engine: Griffon 61
 Seafang F.Mk 32 - ten built
Engine: Griffon 89 - 2,350 hp (1,752 kW)

Jet Spiteful

In late 1943 or early 1944, Supermarine's chief designer Joe Smith suggested Supermarine develop a simple jet fighter based around the Spiteful's wing, and use a new jet engine being proposed by Rolls-Royce (later the Nene). This proposal was accepted and a new specification, E.10/44, was issued by the Air Ministry for an experimental aircraft which was initially referred to as the Jet Spiteful; the prototype TS409 first flew on 27 July 1946. The E.10/44 was not ordered by the RAF, as its performance was not substantially better than the Gloster Meteor and de Havilland Vampire but the Admiralty expressed an interest in the aircraft for use as a naval fighter and issued specification E.1/45 around it. The aircraft was subsequently named Attacker and had a short career with the Fleet Air Arm and the Pakistan Air Force.

Spiteful tail
The enlarged fin/rudder of the Spiteful was also used on the Spitfire Mark 22 and 24s and Seafire Mark 46 and 47s and was usually referred to as the "Spiteful type" tail.

Operators

 Royal Air Force

Specifications (Spiteful XIV)

See also

References
Notes

Citations

Bibliography

 Andrews, C.F. and E.B. Morgan. Supermarine Aircraft since 1914. London: Putnam, Second edition, 1987. .

 Humphreys, Robert. The Supermarine Spitfire, Part 2: Griffon-Powered (Modellers Datafile 5). Bedford, UK: SAM Publications, 2001. .
 Mason, Francis K. The British Fighter since 1912. Annapolis, Maryland: Naval Institute Press, 1992. .
 Morgan, Eric B. and Edward Shacklady. Spitfire: The History (5th rev. edn.). London: Key Publishing, 2000. .
 Price, Alfred. The Spitfire Story. London: Silverdale Books, 1995. .
 Quill, Jeffrey. Spitfire: A Test Pilot's Story. London: Arrow Books, 1985. .
 Robertson, Bruce. Spitfire: The Story of a Famous Fighter. Hemel Hempstead, Hertfordshire, UK: Model & Allied Publications Ltd., 1960. Third revised edition 1973. .

External links

 Spiteful & E.10/44
 Spiteful profile and photo

1940s British fighter aircraft
Spiteful
Single-engined tractor aircraft
Aircraft first flown in 1944